Harding Highway may refer to:

New Jersey Route 48
U.S. Route 40 in New Jersey
Harding Highway (Ohio), eventually extending west to Denver